Hagihara (written:  lit. "Japanese clover field") is a Japanese surname. Notable people with the surname include:

, Japanese footballer
, Japanese footballer
, Japanese astronomer

See also
1971 Hagihara, a main-belt asteroid

Japanese-language surnames